The 1972 Wisconsin–Whitewater Warhawks football team was an American football team that represented the University of Wisconsin–Whitewater as a member of the Wisconsin State University Conference (WSUC) during the 1972 NAIA Division I football season. Led by 17th-year head coach Forrest Perkins, the Warhawks compiled an overall record of 7–3 and a mark of 6–2 in conference play, placing third in the WSUC.

Schedule

References

Wisconsin–Whitewater
Wisconsin–Whitewater Warhawks football seasons
Wisconsin–Whitewater Warhawks football